Robert Jouaville (15 November 1914 – 31 May 1995) was a French wrestler. He competed in the men's freestyle featherweight at the 1948 Summer Olympics.

References

External links
 

1914 births
1995 deaths
French male sport wrestlers
Olympic wrestlers of France
Wrestlers at the 1948 Summer Olympics
Sportspeople from Bordeaux